Panj Hezari (also Romanized as Panj Hezārī) is a village in Faravan Rural District, Kohanabad District, Aradan County, Semnan Province, Iran. As of the 2006 census, its population was 23, in 7 families.

References 

Populated places in Aradan County